I Was Trying to Describe You to Someone may refer to:
 "I Was Trying to Describe You to Someone", a short literary work by Richard Brautigan published in his 1971 collection Revenge of the Lawn
 I Was Trying to Describe You to Someone (Crime in Stereo album), 2010
 I Was Trying to Describe You to Someone (Wednesday album), 2020